Athira is a given name. Notable people with the name include:

 Athira Patel, Indian actress
 L. Athira Krishna, Indian violinist

See also
 Athira Pharma, therapeutics company
 Aathira, 2015 Tamil-language soap opera

Feminine given names